The 2010 Asian Women's Handball Championship was the 13th Asian Championship, which took place from 19 to 25 December 2010 in Almaty, Kazakhstan. It acted as the Asian qualifying tournament for the 2011 World Women's Handball Championship in Brazil.

Due to heavy snow, both South Korea and Japan couldn´t make the trip to Kazakhstan in time and the program was moved forward.

China, Japan, Kazakhstan and South Korea qualified for the World championship after reaching the semifinals.

Draw

Preliminary round
All times are local (UTC+6).

Group A

Group B

Placement 5th–8th

7th/8th

5th/6th

Final round

Semifinals

Bronze medal match

Gold medal match

Final standing

References

Results on todor66.com

External links
www.asianhandball.org
www.handball.jp

Asian women championship
H
International handball competitions hosted by Kazakhstan
Asian Handball Championships
December 2010 sports events in Asia